A colindă (pl. colinde; also colind, pl. colinduri) is a traditional Christmas carol in Romania and the Republic of Moldova.

Origins 
Although the text of all colinde is concerned with the events of the Nativity, certain elements of the folk rituals performed around Christmas are probably pre-Christian in origin, having their roots in the Roman Saturnalia and pagan rituals related to the winter solstice and soil fertility.

Colinde are performed in all parts of Romania (including Moldova), with regional variations in terms of number of participants, exact timing of different melodies and lyrics.

In terms of artistic mastery of verse and melody, colinde occupy an important place in the creation of the Romanian people. They form a unity with doine, popular ballads and songs of bravery, with tales, riddles, proverbs and sayings. Coming from the world of village communities, colinde preserve some of the oldest Romanian poetic achievements. They are inspired by the Holy Scripture and Holy Tradition, by the religious services and by the iconography. Colinde have had a role in preserving and defending the Orthodox faith when heterodox proselytizing tried to break the unity of the Orthodox faith, and to dismantle, at the same time, national unity. The Mother of God, who occupies a central place in piety and Orthodox worship, is present everywhere in Romanian colinde, together with her son, Jesus Christ.

In traditional Romanian rural society, preparations for colinde started well in advance (sometimes weeks) before Christmas. The village youth (usually boys) would begin to form groups in different places and designate a leader in order to practice singing in unison. These groups are called cete de colindători, and their numbers vary from region to region. 
Then, starting on Christmas Eve, the groups would go to different houses and begin singing. In some villages, they go first to the mayor's house, followed by the teacher's house, whereas in other parts there is no pre-established order. The families would then invite them into the house, and give them different small gifts such as nuts, dried fruits and colaci.

Examples of colinde with religious subjects are "Astăzi s-a născut Hristos" (Today Christ was born), "Moș Crăciun cu plete dalbe" (Santa Claus with white tresses) and "O, ce veste minunată!" (O, what wonderful news!).

See also
Koleda, a similar Slavic Christmas tradition
"Shchedryk" (song), a Ukrainian New Year carol
List of Christmas carols

References 

Christmas carols
Moldovan traditions
Moldovan music
Romanian music
Christmas in Romania